Taurean Ellis Nixon (born February 7, 1991) is a former American football cornerback. He was drafted by the Denver Broncos in the seventh round of 2015 NFL Draft. He played college football at Tulane University.

College career
Nixon attended and played college football at the University of Tulane.

Professional career

Denver Broncos
The Denver Broncos selected Nixon in the seventh round with the 251st overall pick of the 2015 NFL Draft. On May 15, 2015, Nixon signed a four-year contract. On September 6, 2015, Nixon was signed to the practice squad. On January 19, 2016, Nixon was promoted to the active roster.
On February 7, 2016, Nixon was part of the Broncos team that won Super Bowl 50. In the game, the Broncos defeated the Carolina Panthers by a score of 24–10.
Nixon was inactive for the game.

On September 3, 2016, Nixon was waived by the Broncos and was signed to their practice squad the next day. He was promoted to the active roster on November 5, 2016. He was waived by the Broncos on November 21, 2016, and was re-signed to the practice squad. He was promoted back to the active roster on December 28, 2016.

On June 14, 2017, Nixon was waived by the Broncos.

Jacksonville Jaguars
On June 15, 2017, Nixon was claimed off waivers by the Jacksonville Jaguars. He was waived/injured by the Jaguars on July 31, 2017, and was placed on injured reserve. He was waived on August 8, 2017.

Kansas City Chiefs
On September 6, 2017, Nixon was signed to the Kansas City Chiefs' practice squad. He was released on September 19, 2017.

Indianapolis Colts
On December 4, 2017, Nixon was signed to the Indianapolis Colts' practice squad. He was released on December 11, 2017.

Los Angeles Rams
On December 27, 2017, Nixon was signed to the Los Angeles Rams' practice squad. He signed a reserve/future contract with the Rams on January 8, 2018. He was waived on August 31, 2018.

References

External links
Denver Broncos bio
Tulane Green Wave bio

1991 births
Living people
American football cornerbacks
Denver Broncos players
Indianapolis Colts players
Jacksonville Jaguars players
Kansas City Chiefs players
Los Angeles Rams players
Players of American football from Baton Rouge, Louisiana
Tulane Green Wave football players